Alex McCulloch may refer to:

 Alexander McCulloch (1887–1951), British rower
 Alex McCulloch (footballer) (1887–1962), Scottish footballer